The Sunhak are a Muslim community found in the state of Himachal Pradesh in India. They are Muslim converts from the Chandel Rajputs of Kahlur.  According to their traditions, their ancestor, a Chandel Rajput married a Muslim woman, and as such he was disowned by other members of his tribe. His descendants now number a few hundred families found in the villages of Chunjhani and Salahon in Bilaspur District. They are to have acquired the name Sunhak for from the Pahari word for hawk, as the community were employed as hawk handlers by the Rajahs of Kahlur.

The Sunhak are strictly endogamous, with the odd intermarriage with the Ranghar and Pathan communities. They are entirely Sunni and speak the Bilaspuri language. However, like other Himachali Muslims, they incorporate folk beliefs such as veneration of regional deities such as Balakh Nath and Guga Pir. The Sunhak are a community of small and medium-sized farmers, with cattle rearing being an important subsidiary occupation. An important subsidiary occupation is service in the army and police. The Sunhak have fairly strong caste council that resolves any intra community dispute and punishes those who transgress community norms.

References 

Muslim communities of India
Social groups of Himachal Pradesh